
Trafton may refer to the following:

People 
 Mark Trafton (1801–1901), American minister and U.S. Congressman
 Adeline Trafton (1842–1920), American author
 George Trafton (1896–1971), American football player
 Stephanie Brown Trafton (born 1979), American track and field athlete

Places 
 Trafton, Washington
 Trafton School, on the U.S. National Register of Historic Places

Other uses 
 Trafton script, designed by Howard Allen Trafton for Bauer Type Foundry